Louis-Philippe, Crown Prince of Belgium (Louis Philippe Léopold Victor Ernest; 24 July 1833 – 16 May 1834), was the eldest child and heir-apparent of King Leopold I of the Belgians and his second wife, Princess Louise d'Orléans.

Life 
Louis-Philippe became crown prince at birth in Laeken. The baby was baptised at the St. Michael and Gudula Cathedral in Brussels by Engelbert Sterckx, the Archbishopric of Mechelen-Brussels. He was named after his maternal grandfather, Louis-Philippe I, King of the French, his father and his cousin, Queen Victoria. He was nicknamed "Babochon".

Death 
Louis-Philippe died in Laeken before his first birthday of an inflammation of the mucous membranes. He was buried in the royal crypt of the Church of Our Lady of Laeken.

Unlike subsequent heirs apparent to the Belgian throne, Louis-Philippe was not Duke of Brabant; this title was not created for the heir-apparent to the throne until 1840. He was followed as crown prince upon the birth of his younger brother, Leopold, who would later succeed their father as Leopold II, King of the Belgians.

Ancestry

References

1833 births
1834 deaths
House of Saxe-Coburg and Gotha (Belgium)
Heirs apparent who never acceded
People from Laeken
Burials at the Church of Our Lady of Laeken
Sons of kings
Royalty and nobility who died as children